Álvaro Gómez (born 30 November 1937) is a Colombian former swimmer. He competed in the men's 200 metre breaststroke at the 1956 Summer Olympics.

References

1937 births
Living people
Colombian male swimmers
Olympic swimmers of Colombia
Swimmers at the 1956 Summer Olympics
Place of birth missing (living people)
Male breaststroke swimmers